ADK may refer to:
ADK (automobile), a Belgian automobile manufactured between 1923 and 1930
ADK (company) or Alpha Denshi, a video game development company in Japan
Adenylate kinase, a phosphotransferase enzyme that plays an important role in cellular energy homeostasis  
Adenosine kinase, an enzyme that catalyzes the transfer of gamma-phosphate from ATP to adenosine
ADK (gene), the gene that in humans encodes adenosine kinase
Adirondack Mountain Club, a nonprofit organization in New York, New Jersey and Massachusetts
Aggressors of Dark Kombat, an arcade game released by SNK and developed by Alpha Denshi Corp, whose acronym is a play on its developer
Android Open Accessory Development Kit
Asatsu DK, a Japanese advertising firm
ADK class diesel multiple unit class of units used on Auckland's suburban network
Adak Airport's IATA Code
Ardwick railway station's National Rail code
ADK, a model for tunnel ionization
Adg (also Romanized as Adk), a village in Razavi Khorasan Province, Iran
Lycée Français Anne de Kiev
Windows ADK, Windows Assessment and Deployment Kit
Dinesh Kanagaratnam or A.D.K., Sri Lankan R&B and hip hop artist and music producer